Roman Angonese v Cassa di Risparmio di Bolzano S.p.A. (2000) C-281/98 is an EU law case, concerning the free movement of workers in the European Union.

Facts
A bank in Bolzano, where Italian and German is spoken, required a certificate of bilingualism. The certificate could only be obtained in Bolzano. Angonese was Italian and had studied in Austria. He was told he could not apply for a job at the bank because he had no certificate, despite being able to speak both languages.

Judgment
The Court of Justice held that the bank's rule was indirect discrimination under TFEU article 45. Because most Bolzano residents were Italian, the requirement to get a certificate in Bolzano put other member state nationals at a disadvantage.

See also

European Union law

Notes

References

Court of Justice of the European Union case law